Alexandre Cassin (born 5 October 1998) is a French table tennis player. He competed in the 2020 Summer Olympics for France.

References

1998 births
Living people
French male table tennis players
Olympic table tennis players of France
Table tennis players at the 2020 Summer Olympics
People from Basse-Terre